Valšov (formerly Vojnovice) is a municipality and village in Bruntál District in the Moravian-Silesian Region of the Czech Republic. It has about 200 inhabitants.

Transport
Valšov lies on the Valšov–Rýmařov railway.

Notable people
Vladimír Stibořík (1927–2014), sports shooter

References

Villages in Bruntál District